The following is a list of Egyptian films. The year order is split by decade. For an alphabetical list of films currently on Wikipedia, see :Category:Egyptian films.

Pre 1920s

1920s

1930s

1940s

1950s

1960s

1970s

1980s

1990s

2000s

2010s

2020s

See also
Cinema of Egypt

External links
 Egyptian film at the Internet Movie Database
 Egyptian film at elCinema.com

 
Lists of Egyptian films by year